Wiener Neustadt Cathedral, or the Cathedral of the Assumption of Mary and St. Rupert , is a Catholic church located in Wiener Neustadt, Austria. Now a parish church, it was previously the cathedral of the diocese of Wiener Neustadt between 1468 and 1785, the year of the suppression of the diocese.

The location and orientation of the building were selected and designed in the Middle Ages. The nave faces north and west in alignment with sunrise on the day of Pentecost on May 24, 1192, when Duke Leopold V was invested by Emperor Henry VI.

In 1207 the construction of the Romanesque church began. It was consecrated in 1279. From 1588 to 1630, Melchor Klesl  was the administrator of the diocese, and built the first Baroque pulpit. The Baroque altar with the altarpiece of the Assumption of Mary by Giandomenico Cignaroli was fitted in 1776. In 1886 the westwork and its towers were demolished because of damage from an earthquake; they were later rebuilt under the direction of the Viennese architect Richard Jordan.

On March 6, 2012, a fire affected the cathedral, which was closed for six months to allow for repairs.

See also
St. George's Cathedral, Wiener Neustadt

References

Churches completed in 1279
Roman Catholic cathedrals in Austria
Buildings and structures in Wiener Neustadt
13th-century Roman Catholic church buildings in Austria
Henry VI, Holy Roman Emperor